Spišské may refer to:

Spišské Bystré, large village and municipality in Poprad District in the Prešov Region of northern Slovakia
Spišské Hanušovce, village and municipality in Kežmarok District in the Prešov Region of north Slovakia
Spišské Podhradie, town in Spiš in the Prešov Region of Slovakia
Spišské Tomášovce, village and municipality in the Spišská Nová Ves District in the Košice Region of central-eastern Slovakia
Spišské Vlachy, town in eastern Slovakia